Saint-Léonard is a commune in the Vosges department in Grand Est in northeastern France.

Geography 

The river Mortagne has its source in the western part of the commune.

See also 
 Communes of the Vosges department

References

External links 

 Official site

Communes of Vosges (department)